In 1926, the “Institute of Mechanical and Electrical Engineering” was founded as part of the Science Faculty of Istanbul University (Istanbul Dar-ül Fünun). In 1934, the institute was bound to “Yüksek Mühendis Mektebi” (Advanced Vocational School for Engineering), today’s Istanbul Technical University, as the Electro-Mechanic Division, which was the start of Department of Electrical Engineering. The first students of this division graduated in 1936. Today, the faculty has three departments: 
Power engineering, Electronics and telecommunications engineering, Control engineering

References

External links 
 ITU School of Electrical and Electronic Engineering
 About the faculty
 Photos of faculty

Istanbul Technical University
Educational institutions established in 1934
1934 establishments in Turkey